The Official Jay Dee Instrumental Series Vol.1: Unreleased is a 2002 EP by American hip hop producer Jay Dee (also known as J Dilla).  The EP was compiled by Jay Dee and Waajeed, and is a collection of previously unreleased beats. Vol. 1 is distributed by Bling 47 and is mainly available through their website.  This release was followed by Vol.2: Vintage, three months later.

Track listing 
"Flyyyyy"
contains a sample of "A Very Smelly, Grubby Little Oik" by Caravan
"Busta"
"L.L."
"Hambro"
"Substitute"
"Guitar"
"Tomita"
contains a sample of "Aranjuez" by Isao Tomita
"Vibe Out"

External links 
Bling 47

2002 debut EPs
J Dilla EPs
Instrumental albums
Albums produced by J Dilla